The Australian Academy of Health and Medical Sciences is an academy to promote health and medical sciences in Australia.  It was established in June 2014.

It cites "The Academy will serve the three purposes identified as of high priority in the 2013 Strategic Review of Health and Medical Research":
 Mentoring the next generation of clinician researchers
 Providing independent advice to government and others on issues relating to evidence-based medical practice and medical researchers
 Providing a forum for discussion on progress on medical research with an emphasis on translation of research into practice

Fellowship
In 2014 the academy commenced awarding the honour of "Fellow of the Australian Academy of Health and Medical Sciences" to 50 medical scientists each year.

Elected fellows include:

 John Aitken elected 2015
 Warwick Anderson (born 1958) elected 2015
 Louise Baur elected 2014
 C. Glenn Begley elected 2015
 Samuel Berkovic (born 1953) elected 2015
 Jeffrey Braithwaite elected 2017
 Richard Bryant (born 1960) elected 2016
 Ed Byrne (born 1952) elected 2015
 Jonathan Carapetis (born 1961) elected 2014
 John Carlin elected 2018
 Jeremy Chapman (born 1953) elected 2017
 Georgia Chenevix-Trench (born 1959) elected 2015
 Helen Christensen elected 2015
 John Christodoulou elected 2017
 Arthur Christopoulos elected 2017
 Judith Clements elected 2017
 Clare Collins elected 2019
 David Cooper (1949–2018) elected 2015
 Brendan Crabb (born 1966) elected 2015
 Annette Dobson (born 1945) elected 2015
 Peter C. Doherty (born 1940) elected 2015
 Stephen Duckett (born 1950) elected 2015
 Sandra Eades (born 1967) elected 2014
 Alan Finkel elected 2015
 Nicholas Fisk (born 1956) elected 2015
 Ian Frazer (born 1953) elected 2014
 Frank Gannon (born 1947) elected 2015
 Katharina Gaus elected 2015
 Jozef Gécz elected 2015
 Paul Glasziou (born 1954) elected 2015
 Michael F. Good elected 2015
 Adele Green (born 1952) elected 2015
 Michelle Haber (born 1956) elected 2015
 Wayne Denis Hall elected 2015
 David Handelsman elected 2015
 Doug Hilton (born 1964) elected 2015
 Michael Kidd (born 1959) elected 2015
 Alison Kitson elected 2015
 Peter Klinken (born 1953) elected 2015
 David de Kretser (born 1939) elected 2015
 Richard Larkins elected 2015
 Sharon Lewin elected 2014
 Julio Licinio elected 2015
 Melissa Little elected 2015
 Fabienne Mackay elected 2016
 Stephen MacMahon elected 2015
 Caroline McMillen elected 2015
 Lisa Maher elected 2017
 Barry Marshall (born 1951) elected 2015
 Nick Martin (born 1950) elected 2015
 Colin L. Masters (born 1947) elected 2015
 John Mattick (born 1950) elected 2015
 Kirsten McCaffery elected 2020
 Kathryn North elected 2014
 Susan Pond elected 2015
 John E. J. Rasko (born 1961) elected 2015
 Karen Reynolds elected 2015
 Maree Teesson elected 2015
 Jane Visvader elected 2016
 Claire Wainwright elected 2016
 Keryn Williams (born 1949) elected 2016
 Fiona Wood (born 1958) elected 2015 
 Sophia Zoungas elected 2022

References

External links
Official website

Medical and health organisations based in Australia
2014 establishments in Australia